"Frances Farmer Will Have Her Revenge on Seattle" is a song by the American rock band Nirvana, written by vocalist and guitarist Kurt Cobain. It is the fifth song on their third and final studio album, In Utero, released in September 1993.

The song's title and lyrics reference the American actress Frances Farmer, a native of the band's adopted hometown of Seattle, Washington, who struggled with mental health issues and faced involuntary commitment several times in her life, which she claimed led to her suffering from systematic abuse. Nirvana biographer Michael Azerrad referred to Farmer as the "patron martyr" of Cobain and his wife, Courtney Love, who identified with her in part because they saw parallels between her mistreatment by the media and their own struggles with the press.

Origin and recording

Early history

"Frances Farmer Will Have Her Revenge on Seattle" was written in 1992. The band's drummer, Dave Grohl, recalled hearing it for the first time during a rehearsal in his basement that year and realizing that the band would soon be recording a new album. According to bassist Krist Novoselic, it was brought to the band "pretty intact," although the "lyrics were left for last."

Several studio versions of the song, all instrumental, were recorded in 1992. The first was recorded by Barrett Jones at Laundry Room Studios in Seattle on April 7, 1992. Three other takes were recorded by Jack Endino at Word of Mouth in Seattle in October 1992.

In Utero

The final studio version was recorded by Steve Albini at Pachyderm Studio in Cannon Falls, Minnesota in February 1993, and was released on In Utero in September 1993.

The song was performed for the first time live on April 9, 1993, at the Bosnian Rape Victim Benefit show at the Cow Palace in San Francisco, California.

Post-In Utero
The final live performance was on February 25, 1994, at Palatrussardi in Milan, Italy.

Composition and lyrics

The song was inspired by the story of Seattle actress Frances Farmer, who appeared in numerous films and theater productions during her career. Following early accusations of atheism and communism, reports began to surface of allegedly erratic behavior, and Farmer was arrested and committed to psychiatric institutions several times before being diagnosed with paranoid schizophrenia. This led to a stay of several years at Western State Hospital in Lakewood, Washington, at the request of her mother and other family members. In her autobiography, Will There Really Be a Morning?, Farmer later recounted what she called the "unbearable terror" of being in the hospital, claiming that she "was raped by orderlies, gnawed on by rats and poisoned by tainted food. I was chained in padded cells, strapped into strait-jackets and half-drowned in ice baths." The accuracy of the book, which was published posthumously and partially ghost written by a friend, is disputed, but Farmer is confirmed to have suffered from poor conditions at the hospital, undergoing electroconvulsive shock therapy as was then standard at the institution. After her release in 1950, Farmer successfully fought for release from the conservatorship of her mother and attempted a comeback as an actor. She was diagnosed with esophageal cancer due to her excessive smoking, and died in 1970 at the age of 56.

Cobain had been fascinated by Farmer's life since high school, when he first read the controversial 1978 Farmer biography, Shadowland, by Seattle Post-Intelligencer film critic, William Arnold. According to journalist Gillian G. Garr, Cobain grew to identify "even more with Farmer's story" after his own success with Nirvana, "especially with Farmer's unconventional nature, her outspoken dislike of commercialism, her hounding by the media, and her sad, unjust fate." In 1993, Cobain made several attempts to contact Arnold, who did not respond. Cobain eventually contacted the Post-Intelligencer''' Arts and Entertainment editor, and was surprised when Arnold did not know who he was. Arnold states that Cobain then "called and left this rambling message," which included Cobain's theory that he was related to the judge who had signed the first order to commit Farmer. "I thought to myself, 'I've really got to talk to this guy,'" Arnold recalls, "but I was going through some other stuff then and I just didn't. Then he killed himself and I felt really bad." Arnold, who did not hear the song during Cobain's lifetime, had written "Return the call of K.C. - the Nirvana guy!" at the top of his to-do list for April 8, 1994, the day that Cobain's body was found.

Arnold instead wrote an article for the Post-Intelligencer, published on April 14, 1994, titled "Cobain Found a Kindred Spirit in Frances Farmer's Troubled Life," in which he stated that "Cobain's behaviour might be interpreted as the actions of a man determined to embody the spirit of Frances Farmer." John D. Luerssen, author of the 2014 biography Nirvana FAQ: All That's Left to Know About the Most Important Band of the 1990s, also noted similarities between Farmer's personality and Cobain's, writing that "the parallels between the actress - who once listed her occupation as 'cocksucker' when she was arrested - and the rocker are remarkable. Both were strong-willed and rebellious, and defiant for the sake of their art."

Cobain discussed the song in depth in Azerrad's 1993 biography, Come As You Are: The Story of Nirvana, saying that "I guess that's my way of letting the world know that bureaucracy is everywhere and it can happen to anybody and it's a really evil thing. The story of Frances Farmer is so sad and it can happen to anybody and it almost felt at a time that it was happening to us...but it's mainly just exposing the Frances Farmer story to people." According to Azerrad, the lines "In her false witness/ We hope you're still with us" were an attack on those who believed the claims in a September 1992 Vanity Fair article by Lynn Hirschberg, which alleged that Love had used heroin while pregnant. Both Azerrad and Garr note the theme of revenge in lines such as "She'll come back as fire/ And burn all the liars/ And leave a blanket of ash on the ground," with Garr saying the song represents "a rare case of someone emerging triumphant in a Nirvana song."

On February 24, 1992, Love wore a satin lace dress previously owned by Farmer when she married Cobain on Waikiki Beach in Honolulu, Hawaii. Cobain's and Love's daughter, Frances Bean Cobain, was named after Frances McKee, vocalist and guitarist for the Scottish indie pop band the Vaselines, and not Farmer.

Reception

In 2015, Rolling Stone placed "Frances Farmer Will Have Her Revenge on Seattle" at number 25 on their No Apologies: All 102 Nirvana Songs Ranked list. In 2019, it was ranked at number 43 in the NME's Every Nirvana song ranked in order of greatness list, with Tom Howard describing it as a "magnificent song".

On February 4, 2009, "Frances Farmer Will Have Her Revenge on Seattle" appeared as the final song on Episode 18 of the third season of Theme Time Radio Hour, a weekly satellite radio show hosted by American musician Bob Dylan. At the conclusion of the song, Dylan said, "Farewell, Frances. Farewell, Kurt".

On April 24, 2020, "Frances Farmer Will Have Her Revenge on Seattle" was performed as the opening song on a virtual Nirvana tribute concert by American musician, Post Malone. The 15-song concert was livestreamed on YouTube, and raised more than $4 million for the COVID-19 Solidarity Response Fund.

Other releases

A solo acoustic demo of the song, recorded in 1992, appeared on the compilation Montage of Heck: The Home Recordings, released in November 2015.
A remixed version of the In Utero version, done by Albini in 2013, appeared on the 20th anniversary "Deluxe" and "Super Deluxe" versions of the album, released in September 2013.
The instrumental version recorded at Laundry Room in Seattle on April 7, 1992, was released on the 20th anniversary "Deluxe" and "Super Deluxe" versions of In Utero''.

Unreleased versions

None of the three instrumental takes recorded at Word of Mouth in Seattle in October 1992 have been officially released.

Cover versions

References

1993 songs
Nirvana (band) songs
Songs about actors
Songs written by Kurt Cobain
Song recordings produced by Steve Albini